Popular Union was a political party in Peru. It was founded ahead of the 1931 Constituent Assembly election. The Popular Union was the first social-Christian party in the country, the precursor of the Christian Democrat Party.

References

Defunct political parties in Peru
Christian democratic parties in South America